Manuel Augusto González (born December 4, 1979) is a Venezuelan umpire in Major League Baseball (MLB). He made his major-league umpiring debut on May 17, 2010, filling in for John Hirschbeck, becoming the first Venezuelan umpire in MLB history.

González umpired 11 MLB games in 2010, and returned to umpire 42 MLB games in 2011 before being hired to the full-time MLB staff in early 2013. He issued his first career ejection on June 26, 2012, when Ike Davis was tossed for arguing a safe call at first base in Chicago.

González was the second base umpire for the no-hitter by Alec Mills of the Chicago Cubs against the Milwaukee Brewers on September 13, 2020.

González was forced to leave a game at Fenway Park on September 6, 2021, after being hit in the mask by a foul tip while umpiring behind the plate.

See also

 List of Major League Baseball umpires

References

1979 births
Living people
Major League Baseball umpires
Sportspeople from Caracas